Antonov Airport , also known as Hostomel (or Gostomel) Airport, is an international cargo airport and testing facility in Ukraine, located near Hostomel, which is a northwestern suburb of Kyiv.

The airport is owned by and named after the Antonov aircraft manufacturing company and operated by its subsidiary Antonov Airlines. The destroyed An-225 was based here. 

During the 2022 Russian invasion of Ukraine, the airport became the site of an intense battle. It was temporarily held by Russian forces and sustained heavy damage to facilities and aircraft.

History
Construction of the airport began in 1959. Commercial cargo operations at the airport began in 1989 with the first attempts at demilitarizing and commercializing of the Antonov Design Bureau.

2022 Russian invasion of Ukraine

On 24 February 2022, the first day of the 2022 Russian invasion of Ukraine, the airport was attacked and seized by the Russian military. On the day, Ukrainian President Volodymyr Zelenskyy said "The enemy paratroopers in Hostomel have been blocked, and troops have received an order to destroy them". Later in the day, between 8-10 PM local time (UTC+2) reports surfaced that the airport had been retaken, but heavy fighting continued for weeks at the airport and in neighboring Hostomel.  Ukrainian forces regained control of the airport by 2 April, but the airport sustained extensive damage and the notable An-225 cargo aircraft was destroyed.

The Virgin Galactic owner, Sir Richard Branson, visited the President of Ukraine and the damaged airport and had interest in investing in rebuilding it.

Aircraft testing operations
Gostomel Airport was originally built as a top-secret in-house Flight Testing and Improvement Base for Antonov airplanes. It is equipped with special equipment for it (e.g., artificial lightning generator) and granted a purpose test flight zone. Its sister facility, responsible for manufacturing, is located inside Kyiv at the Sviatoshyn Airfield.

Cargo operations

The airport is used by Antonov Airlines, as well as by other interested cargo carriers. The following facilities and services are available on site:
transshipping (air-to-auto; air-to-railway)
storage capacities
border control and customs
aircraft maintenance

Military presence
Ukrainian Air Force was using the airport for its transportation forces.

The An-225 "Mriya" (tr. 'dream' or 'inspiration'), the world's largest cargo aircraft, was located at Hostomel Airport before its partial destruction during the 2022 Russian invasion of Ukraine.

See also 
 List of airports in Ukraine
 List of the busiest airports in Ukraine

Notes

References

External links 

 Antonov Airport at Antonov ASTC corporate Web site
NOAA/NWS Weather observations for the Antonov Airport
ASN Accident history for the Antonov Airport

Airports in Kyiv
Antonov
Airports established in 1959
1959 establishments in Ukraine
Soviet Air Force bases
Ukrainian airbases
Buildings and structures destroyed during the 2022 Russian invasion of Ukraine